Pamela Sue Higgins (born December 5, 1945) is an American professional golfer who played on the LPGA Tour.

Higgins won three times on the LPGA Tour between 1971 and 1980.

Professional wins

LPGA Tour wins (3)

LPGA Tour playoff record (1–0)

References

External links

American female golfers
Ohio State Buckeyes women's golfers
LPGA Tour golfers
Golfers from Ohio
People from Groveport, Ohio
1945 births
Living people